Karnendu Bhattacharjee (2 May 1938 – 23 December 2022) was an Indian politician who served as a Member of the Parliament. A member of the Indian National Congress party, he represented Assam in the Rajya Sabha, the upper house of the Indian Parliament from 1996 to 2008.

Bhattacharjee died on 23 December 2022, at the age of 84.

References

External links
 Profile on Rajya Sabha website

1938 births
Place of birth missing
2022 deaths
Indian National Congress politicians
Indian National Congress politicians from Assam
Rajya Sabha members from Assam